Jason Petkovic (born 7 December 1972 in Perth, Western Australia) is an Australian football (soccer) player. He is the brother of Michael Petkovic.

Club career
He played as a goalkeeper for the Australian A-League club Perth Glory where he has won two championships with them in 2003 and 2004. Petkovic has also had trials with Southampton F.C. and Norway's Rosenborg BK before joining NSL outfit Adelaide City in 1993. A broken leg sustained during a match against the Central Coast Mariners has ended his A-League 2006-07 season and possibly his career. However, in Round 19 of the A-League 2007-08 season he made a return to Perth against the Central Coast Mariners which ended in a 1-1 draw showing good signs of his recovery.

On 11 January 2009 he played his last professional game after announcing his retirement in the Round 19 A-League game against the Melbourne Victory which the Glory went on to win 3-2.

A-League career statistics 
()

Honours 
With Darwin Cubs:
 Runner up Singapore Premier League: 1994
With Perth Glory:
 NSL Championship: 2002-2003, 2003–2004
With Adelaide City:
 NSL Championship: 1993-1994

External links
 Perth Glory profile
 Oz Football profile
 

1972 births
Living people
Sportsmen from Western Australia
Australian people of Croatian descent
Australian soccer players
Association football goalkeepers
Australian expatriate soccer players
Australia international soccer players
A-League Men players
Adelaide City FC players
Konyaspor footballers
Perth Glory FC players
Süper Lig players
Expatriate footballers in Turkey
Australian expatriate sportspeople in Turkey
1998 OFC Nations Cup players
2000 OFC Nations Cup players
2002 OFC Nations Cup players
Soccer players from Perth, Western Australia